Udo Schwarz (born 7 July 1986) is a German international rugby union player, playing for the SC Neuenheim in the Rugby-Bundesliga and the German national rugby union team.

Schwarz played one game for Germany, against a Welsh Districts XV on 28 November 2008.

Honours

Club
 German rugby union championship
 Runners up: 2012

Stats
Udo Schwarz's personal statistics in club and international rugby:

National team

 As of 26 March 2010

Club

 As of 25 August 2011

References

External links
   Udo Schwarz at totalrugby.de

1986 births
Living people
German rugby union players
Germany international rugby union players
SC Neuenheim players
Heidelberger TV players
TV Pforzheim players
Rugby union wings